The Pennsylvania Railroad (PRR) class CC1s consisted of a single experimental 0-8-8-0 steam locomotive built by Baldwin Locomotive Works in 1912. It was assigned road number #3397 and placed in service at the PRR Pitcairn yard in Pitcairn, Pennsylvania, near Pittsburgh. A subsequent class, the CC2s, was constructed after the tests conducted with this locomotive. Finding little advantage to articulated steam locomotives, the PRR scrapped it in 1932.

Baldwin locomotives
0-8-8-0 locomotives
Steam locomotives of the United States
CC1s
Individual locomotives of the United States
Scrapped locomotives
Unique locomotives
Standard gauge locomotives of the United States
Railway locomotives introduced in 1912